Lee Tae-hong (Korean: 이태홍; born October 1, 1971) is a South Korean former footballer who played as a forward.

He started professional career at Ilhwa Chunma in 1992 and he transferred to Bucheon SK in April 1997.
He was captain of Unified Korea national under-17 football team in 1991 FIFA World Youth Championship.

References

External links 
 
 Lee Tae-hong – National Team Stats at KFA 
 

1971 births
Living people
Association football forwards
Seongnam FC players
Jeju United FC players
K League 1 players
South Korean footballers
Daegu University alumni